The Clergyman is a 1914 Swedish silent drama film directed by Victor Sjöström.

Cast
 Carl Borin
 Egil Eide as Priest
 Justus Hagman as Older Priest
 William Larsson as Clara's Father
 Richard Lund as Estate Owner
 Clara Pontoppidan as Maria
 Carlo Wieth as Frans

References

External links

1914 films
1910s Swedish-language films
Swedish black-and-white films
1914 drama films
Swedish silent feature films
Films directed by Victor Sjöström
Swedish drama films
Silent drama films